Orchomenus or Orchomenos was a town of ancient Euboea.

References

Populated places in ancient Euboea
Former populated places in Greece
Lost ancient cities and towns